Giorgi Aburjania (born 2 January 1995) is a Georgian professional footballer who plays as a central midfielder for Portuguese club Gil Vicente F.C. and the Georgia national team.

Club career 
Aburjania kicked off his career with Metalurgi Rustavi in 2010. He then had stints with Dila and Lokomotivi Tbilisi. On 17 June 2014, he signed for Cypriot club Anorthosis Famagusta on a two-year contract.

On 8 January 2016 Aburjania moved to Spain, after agreeing to a three-and-a-half year contract with Segunda División side Gimnàstic de Tarragona. He made his debut for the club late in the month, coming on as a second-half substitute for Lévy Madinda in a 2–1 home win against CD Tenerife.

Aburjania subsequently became an undisputed starter for Vicente Moreno's side, and scored his first goal for the club on 20 March 2016 in a 4–0 away routing of Bilbao Athletic. On 2 August he signed a four-year contract with Sevilla FC, being assigned to the reserves also in the second division, for a rumoured fee of € 1 million.

On 1 August 2018, after suffering relegation, Aburjania was loaned to fellow second division side CD Lugo, for one year. In July of the following year, he moved to FC Twente also in a temporary deal.

On 20 September 2020, Aburjania agreed to a one-year contract with Real Oviedo in the second division. The following 28 January, after being rarely used, he cut ties with the club and signed a short-term deal with fellow league team FC Cartagena just hours later.

On 3 July 2021, free agent Aburjania signed a two-year deal with Primeira Liga side Gil Vicente F.C.

International career
After representing Georgia at the under-17, under-19 and under-21 levels, Aburjania made his debut with the full squad on 29 March 2016, starting in a 1–1 friendly draw against Kazakhstan.

References

External links

1995 births
Living people
Footballers from Tbilisi
Association football midfielders
Footballers from Georgia (country)
Erovnuli Liga players
FC Metalurgi Rustavi players
FC Dila Gori players
FC Lokomotivi Tbilisi players
Cypriot First Division players
Anorthosis Famagusta F.C. players
Segunda División players
Gimnàstic de Tarragona footballers
Sevilla Atlético players
CD Lugo players
Real Oviedo players
FC Cartagena footballers
Eredivisie players
FC Twente players
Gil Vicente F.C. players
Georgia (country) under-21 international footballers
Georgia (country) international footballers
Expatriate footballers from Georgia (country)
Expatriate sportspeople from Georgia (country) in Cyprus
Expatriate sportspeople from Georgia (country) in Spain
Expatriate sportspeople from Georgia (country) in Portugal
Expatriate footballers in Cyprus
Expatriate footballers in Spain
Expatriate footballers in the Netherlands
Expatriate footballers in Portugal
Georgia (country) youth international footballers